Sonora is an unincorporated community in Muskingum County, in the U.S. state of Ohio.

History
Sonora was laid out in 1852. A post office called Sonora was established in 1855, and remained in operation until 1988.

References

Unincorporated communities in Muskingum County, Ohio
1852 establishments in Ohio
Populated places established in 1852
Unincorporated communities in Ohio